Metamora Township is one of thirteen townships in Franklin County, Indiana. As of the 2010 census, its population was 974.

History
Metamora Township was established in 1849 from land given by Salt Creek, Laurel and Brookville townships.

The Duck Creek Aqueduct was listed on the National Register of Historic Places and designated a National Historic Landmark in 2014.

Geography

Unincorporated towns
 Metamora
 Millville
(This list is based on USGS data and may include former settlements.)

Adjacent townships
 Blooming Grove Township (northeast)
 Brookville Township (east)
 Butler Township (south)
 Salt Creek Township (west)
 Laurel Township (northwest)

Major highways
 U.S. Route 52
 Indiana State Road 229

Cemeteries
The township contains one cemetery, McKenzie.

Education
Metamora Township residents may obtain a free library card from the Franklin County Public Library District in Brookville.

References
 United States Census Bureau cartographic boundary files
 U.S. Board on Geographic Names

External links
 Indiana Township Association
 United Township Association of Indiana

Townships in Franklin County, Indiana
Townships in Indiana